The Suite Life of Zack & Cody is an American sitcom created by Danny Kallis and Jim Geoghan. The series aired on Disney Channel from March 18, 2005, to September 1, 2008. The series was nominated for an Emmy Award three times and was also nominated for a Nickelodeon Kids' Choice Award three times.

The series is primarily set at the Tipton Hotel in Boston and centers on Zack and Cody Martin (Dylan and Cole Sprouse), a set of twin brothers who live in the hotel's suite. The series' other main characters include the Tipton hotel's heiress London Tipton (Brenda Song), the hotel's candy counter girl Maddie Fitzpatrick (Ashley Tisdale), the manager, Mr. Marion Moseby (Phill Lewis), and the boys' single mother who is also the Hotel's lounge singer, Carey Martin (Kim Rhodes). The series is the third Disney Channel Original to have more than 65 episodes, after That's So Raven and Kim Possible.

The Suite Life launched a sequel series, also starring the Sprouse twins in their respective roles as Zack and Cody, called The Suite Life on Deck, which aired on Disney Channel from 2008 to 2011. A TV movie based on both series, The Suite Life Movie, premiered on Disney Channel on March 25, 2011.

Premise
The series centers on Zack and Cody Martin, 12-year-old twin brothers who live in the luxurious Tipton Hotel in Boston, where their mother Carey sings and performs in the hotel lounge. The identical twins often cause mischief at their residence. The series also follows the hotel owner's teenage daughter London Tipton (a parody of Paris Hilton), the hotel's candy-counter girl, Maddie Fitzpatrick, and Mr. Moseby, the hotel manager, who is often the foil to Zack and Cody's schemes. 

The show is often set at the Tipton Hotel, but has other settings such as Zack and Cody's school, Cheevers High, and Maddie and London's private school, Our Lady of Perpetual Sorrow Catholic. Zack and Cody often get in trouble and come up with ideas to get out of it. In the 3rd season the show is also set at the store Zack and Cody work for: Paul Revere Mini Mart, and the camp that Maddie works for: Camp Heaven on Earth.

Characters

Main

Cody Martin (Cole Sprouse), the mature, and smarter twin. He is a "straight A" student. In the first season of the show, it was revealed that Cody is the more gentle twin compared to his brother and somehow always gets talked into going along with Zack's schemes. 
Zack Martin (Dylan Sprouse), the self-centered, outgoing, older twin, who usually dresses in skater and baggy-camo clothes.
London Tipton (Brenda Song), the only daughter of Wilfred Tipton, the owner of the Tipton Hotel. London is a teenager with her own private suite at the Tipton Hotel in Boston. London loves fashion; she only wears designer clothes. She has her own web show called Yay Me! Starring London Tipton.
Maddie Fitzpatrick (Ashley Tisdale), the teenage candy-counter girl at the Tipton Hotel and London's best friend. She comes from a lower-class family, and as such Maddie is hard-working, outspoken, and intelligent.
Marion Moseby (Phill Lewis), the stern and uptight manager of the Tipton Hotel, who speaks with a large vocabulary and an urbane vernacular, and is often annoyed by Zack's and Cody's schemes. Mr. Moseby acts as a father figure towards London, as Mr. Tipton is seldom around.
Carey Martin (Kim Rhodes), the single working mother of Zack and Cody. She is the hotel's lounge singer. She and her sons traveled to several cities before arriving at the Boston Tipton Hotel. She was married to Kurt Martin, but they divorced after the twins were born for unstated reasons.

Recurring
 
Esteban Ramirez (Adrian R'Mante), the hotel's bellhop.
Arwin Hawkhauser (Brian Stepanek), the hotel's janitor and aspiring inventor.

Production

The Suite Life of Zack & Cody premiered in March 2005, starring Dylan and Cole Sprouse, Brenda Song, Ashley Tisdale, Phill Lewis and Kim Rhodes. President of Disney Channels Worldwide Gary Marsh described the actors as an ensemble cast. The series filmed in front of a live studio audience in Hollywood. The series was produced by It's a Laugh Productions, created by Danny Kallis and Jim Geoghan.

During the production of the first season, five additional episodes were ordered, bringing the total to 26.

The series was renewed for a third season in November 2006, after 65 episodes had already been completed. Production was scheduled to resume in January 2007.

Series overview

The series filmed an episode which aired as part of network crossover special, That's So Suite Life of Hannah Montana, which aired on July 28, 2006, as a crossover featuring That's So Raven and Hannah Montana.

Reception
By 2006, The Suite Life of Zack & Cody was one of Disney Channel's top-rated programs.

Awards and nominations

Other media

Sequel series, film and adaptation

The Suite Life on Deck is a sequel to The Suite Life of Zack & Cody, that debuted on Disney Channel on September 26, 2008, set on a cruise ship with Zack, Cody, and London attending a semester-at-sea program, while Mr. Moseby manages the ship. Debby Ryan joins the cast as Bailey Pickett, who becomes Zack and Cody's friend (and Cody's girlfriend) and London's friend and roommate. The series also introduces Doc Shaw as Marcus Little, a former superstar who lost his fame after his voice changed.  While an attempted spin-off, Arwin!, which was to star Selena Gomez and Brian Stepanek, was not picked up by Disney Channel, The Suite Life on Deck skipped the pilot process and went straight to the series. The Suite Life on Deck eventually ended on May 6, 2011.

On September 20, 2010, Disney Channel announced that production has begun for a Disney Channel Original Movie based on The Suite Life of Zack & Cody and The Suite Life on Deck. The Suite Life Movie premiered on Disney Channel in the United States and Canada on March 25, 2011. 

An Indian adaptation of the show, titled The Suite Life of Karan & Kabir, premiered on Disney Channel India on April 8, 2012. It ran for two seasons and ended on January 19, 2014.

Merchandising
The series has spawned three video games entitled The Suite Life of Zack & Cody: Tipton Caper for the Game Boy Advance, The Suite Life of Zack & Cody: Tipton Trouble, and The Suite Life of Zack & Cody: Circle of Spies for the Nintendo DS. They were developed by Artificial Mind and Movement and published by Buena Vista Games, with the exception of Circle of Spies, which was published by Disney Interactive Studios.

Disney Press has released several books based on the shows including The Suite Life of Zack & Cody: Tipton Caper, The Suite Life of Zack & Cody: Tipton Trouble, and The Suite Life of Zack & Cody: Circle of Spies novels based on the television episode and the video game. Merchandise based on the series include clothing, bags, bedding, and toys.

The Suite Life of Zack & Cody had a number of novels based on episodes of the series, as well as original books.

References

External links

 
 

 
2000s American teen sitcoms
2005 American television series debuts
2008 American television series endings
ABC Kids (TV programming block)
Disney Channel original programming
English-language television shows
Television series about brothers
Television series about teenagers
Television series about twins
Television series by It's a Laugh Productions
Television series set in hotels
Television shows set in Boston
Works about twin brothers